Drenpa Namkha (དྲན་པ་ནམ་མཁའ་ Tibetan: dran pa nam mkha' ) was born in the 8th century near Mount Kailash in Chunlung Ngul Kha (Khyung lung dngul mkhar) in south-western Tibet.  As a young student he was a blessed with eight principal Bon teachers. Drenpa Namkha became a self-realized supreme master of the three Bon practices, known as Sutra, Tantra and Dzogchen. Drenpa Namkha is the primary long-life deity according to Bon.

Drenpa Namkha is a popular personage in the Bon tradition. Drenpa Namkha's biography in eight volumes was published by sPa-tshang Sonam Gyantsan, Delhi in 1983. Drenpa Namkha is said to have had twin sons: Tshe-dbang Rig-'dzin, a Bon teacher, and Pad-ma 'Byung-gnas, the famous Buddhist teacher Padmsambhava.

Later masters said to be reincarnations of Drenpa Namkha include Bonpo Traksel (bon po brag tshal, d.u.), Rigdzin Trinle Lhundrub (rig 'dzin phrin las lhun grub, d.u.), and Drenpa Zungi Namtrul (dren pa zung gi rnam 'phrul, d.u.).

Iconography 
Drenpa Namkha holds a Yungdrung chakshing in his right hand to indicate the indestructibility and permanence of the Bon teachings. Victory over heretics is symbolized by the eye on the sole of his foot.

Notes

References 
 Karmay (1972). The Treasury of Good Sayings, Oxford University Press, London.
 Kvæne, Per (1995). The Bon Religion Of Tibet:  The Iconography Of A Living Tradition.

Bon